The Insidious Lie is Craig's Brother's third full-length album.  It was available for streaming in its entirety online at www.CraigsBrother.com on Christmas Day 2010, and then released on January 24, 2011 as a digital download. The song "Crutch" was omitted from the download version in order to be included as a bonus track on a Japanese release at a later date.
According to vocalist Ted Bond, the record deals more directly with issues of spirituality, as they've come to re-evaluate their position as Christians and punkrockers, but it also deals with drug use and sex and war. "The Insidious Lie" was the title of an entry in the band's blog by Ted Bond from October 6, 2006, about the music industry.

Track listing
"Freedom" – 2:12
"Mistake Of Caring" – 3:51
"Thousand Yard Stare" – 4:03
"Klamath Falls" – 3:38
"Insidious Lie" – 3:31
"Party Girl" – 3:14
"Closure" – 3:14
"Fallen" – 3:13
"Adeline" - 3:29
"The Problem Of Evil" - 3:41
"The Aaronic Blessing (Peace on Earth)" - 5:15

Personnel

Craig's Brother
Ted Bond - Lead vocals and guitar
Glade Wilson - Guitar and background vocals
Scott Hrapoff - Bass
Heath Konkel - Drums and background vocals

Featuring
Andy Snyder - Guitar and background vocals
Steven Neufeld - Guitar and background vocals
Chris Merrit - Piano
Erin Bond - Background vocals
Adam Nigh - Background vocals
Ryan Sabouhi - Background vocals

Technical Credits
Kyle Black - Producer, engineer at The Compound; mixing and mastering at Mike Green's studio
Joe Clements - Engineer at The Compound
Ryan Sabouhi - Assistant engineer at The Compound
Andy Snyder - Co-producer, engineer, and mixing (Adaline only) at DK2 Studios and The Compound
Ted Bond - Co-producer

References

2011 albums
Craig's Brother albums